Výprachtice is a municipality and village in Ústí nad Orlicí District in the Pardubice Region of the Czech Republic. It has about 900 inhabitants.

Administrative parts
Villages of Koburk and Valteřice are administrative parts of Výprachtice.

References

External links

Villages in Ústí nad Orlicí District